Gluta sabahana is a tree of Borneo in the cashew and sumac family Anacardiaceae. The specific epithet  is from the Latin meaning "of Sabah".

Description
Its dark brown bark is smooth to scaly. The flowers are whitish.

Distribution and habitat
Gluta sabahana is endemic to Borneo, where it is confined to Sabah. Its habitat is lowland forests, including swamps, below  altitude.

References

sabahana
Endemic flora of Borneo
Trees of Borneo
Flora of Sabah
Plants described in 1978